The following is the final results of the 1974 World Wrestling Championships. Freestyle competition were held in Istanbul, Turkey and Greco-Roman competition were held in Katowice, Poland.

Medal table

Team ranking

Medal summary

Men's freestyle

Men's Greco-Roman

References
FILA Database

World Wrestling Championships
International wrestling competitions hosted by Poland
World Wrestling Championships, 1974
Sport in Istanbul
1974 in Turkish sport
1974 in Polish sport
1970s in Istanbul
World 1974